Raden Panji Soeroso (EYD: Suroso) (born in Porong, Sidoarjo, East Java, Dutch East Indies, 3 November 1893 - died in Indonesia, 16 May 1981 at the age of 87 years) was a politician, Sarekat Islam activist, and a National Hero of Indonesia. He served as Governor of Central Java and Minister of Public Works and Manpower under the Great Indonesia Party. He was also a vice chairman of the BPUPK and a member of PPKI. He was the founder of the Civil Servants Cooperative Republic of Indonesia. Soeroso was born in Porong, Sidoarjo, East Java, Dutch East Indies. Soeroso was posthumously honored as an Indonesian National Hero through a Presidential Decree issued on October 23, 1986. He died in Indonesia.

Personal life
One of his sons was Raden Panji Soejono (1926–present), an antiquities expert and senior archaeologist in Indonesia. Soejono is professor of prehistoric archeology at several universities in Indonesia. Among others: University of Indonesia, Gadjah Mada University and Udayana University. He was head of the National Archaeological Research Center (Pusat Penelitian Arkeologi Nasional) during the period of 1974-1989.

References

1893 births
1981 deaths
Government ministers of Indonesia
Governors of Central Java
Indonesian collaborators with Imperial Japan
Interior ministers of Indonesia
Members of the Central Advisory Council
National Heroes of Indonesia
People from Sidoarjo Regency
Sarekat Islam politicians
Social affairs ministers of Indonesia